Craig is a city in Holt County, Missouri, United States. The population was 105 at the 2020 census.

History
Craig was laid out in 1868. The city was named after the attorney and Missouri politician James Craig. A post office called Craig has been in operation since 1869.

Geography
Craig is located at  (40.192220, -95.373617).

Demographics

2010 census
As of the census of 2010, there were 248 people, 110 households, and 67 families living in the city. The racial makeup of the city was 99.2% White, 0.4% Native American, and 0.4% from other races. Hispanic or Latino of any race were 0.8% of the population.

There were 110 households, of which 25.5% had children under the age of 18 living with them, 44.5% were married couples living together, 10.0% had a female householder with no husband present, 6.4% had a male householder with no wife present, and 39.1% were non-families. 31.8% of all households were made up of individuals, and 15.4% had someone living alone who was 65 years of age or older. The average household size was 2.25 and the average family size was 2.81.

The median age in the city was 47 years. 18.1% of residents were under the age of 18; 10.5% were between the ages of 18 and 24; 18.8% were from 25 to 44; 33.2% were from 45 to 64; and 19.4% were 65 years of age or older. The gender makeup of the city was 49.6% male and 50.4% female.

2000 census
As of the census of 2000, there were 309 people, 131 households, and 77 families living in the city. The population density was 1,120.0 people per square mile (426.1/km2). There were 154 housing units at an average density of 558.2 per square mile (212.4/km2). The racial makeup of the city was 99.68% White, and 0.32% from two or more races. Hispanic or Latino of any race were 0.32% of the population.

There were 131 households, out of which 29.8% had children under the age of 18 living with them, 47.3% were married couples living together, 6.1% had a female householder with no husband present, and 40.5% were non-families. 36.6% of all households were made up of individuals, and 22.1% had someone living alone who was 65 years of age or older. The average household size was 2.36 and the average family size was 3.15.

In the city the population was spread out, with 26.5% under the age of 18, 10.0% from 18 to 24, 22.3% from 25 to 44, 21.4% from 45 to 64, and 19.7% who were 65 years of age or older. The median age was 38 years. For every 100 females, there were 100.6 males. For every 100 females age 18 and over, there were 97.4 males.

The median income for a household in the city was $22,500, and the median income for a family was $26,750. Males had a median income of $30,114 versus $15,625 for females. The per capita income for the city was $10,719. About 14.5% of families and 17.9% of the population were below the poverty line, including 14.5% of those under the age of eighteen and 23.1% of those 65 or over.

References

External links
 Historic maps of Craig in the Sanborn Maps of Missouri Collection at the University of Missouri

Cities in Holt County, Missouri
Cities in Missouri